Fuat Uzkınay   (b. 1888 - Istanbul, d. 29 March 1956 - Istanbul) was the first Turkish filmmaker.

After finishing Istanbul Highschool, he took physics and chemistry classes at Istanbul University. While he started to work at a high school as a principal, there was a growing interest in cinema among the Ottomans. Uzkınay started to give lessons at his school in order to make his students familiar with cinema. Despite the fact that numerous cinemas existed in Istanbul, Uzkınay campaigned for the building of a Turkish-owned cinema, which opened on 19 March 1914. The name, "The National Cinema", would change later to "Ali Efendi sineması". Meanwhile, he learned to use the projector from Sigmund Weinberg, who was the first man to introduce the cinema to the Ottomans.

While in the army, on 14 November 1914 he made the documentary film "Ayastefanos'taki Rus Abidesinin Yıkılışı", depicting the destruction of the Russian Monument at Ayastefanos. This 150mt. film is known as the first documentary film of the Turkish Cinema. One year later, he founded, on the order of General Enver Paşa, the "Central Army Cinema Department". Sigmund Weinberg was the Chairman of the department and Uzkınay was his assistant. One year later, Uzkınay succeeded Weinberg in that position.

He received education in Germany on film production. He completed his first movie "Himmet Ağa'nın İzdivacı" in 1918, despite many difficulties he encountered. In 1954, he retired from the Turkish army and died in 1956.

Filmography (Director)

Victory of İzmir - İzmir Zaferi / İstiklal - 1942 
At the road of Victory -  Zafer Yollarında - 1923 
The marriage of Himmet - Himmet Ağa'nın İzdivacı - 1918 
Leblebici Horhor Ağa - 1916 
Ayastefanos'taki Rus Abidesinin Yıkılışı- The destruction of Russian Monumental at Ayestefanos - 1914

Filmography (Producer)

Bican Efendi Mektep Hocası - 1921 
Bican Efendi'nin Rüyası - 1921 
Binnaz - 1919 
Mürebbiye - 1919 
Himmet Ağa'nın İzdivacı - 1918 
Bican Efendi Vekilharç - 1917

Filmography (D.O.P.)

Boğaziçi Esrarı / Nur Baba - 1922 
Bican Efendi Mektep Hocası - 1921 
Bican Efendi'nin Rüyası - 1921 
Binnaz - 1919 
Mürebbiye - 1919 
Tombul Aşığın Dört Sevgilisi - 1919 
Himmet Ağa'nın İzdivacı - 1918 
Bican Efendi Vekilharç - 1917 
Ayastefanos'taki Rus Abidesinin Yıkılışı - 1914

Filmography (Screenplay) 
 Zafer Yollarında - 1923

See also 
 Cinema of Turkey

References

External links
 http://www.mustafacetin.org/tr/fuat-uzkinay-hakkinda-dr-mustafa-cetin-wwwmustafacetinorg-ayastefanostaki-rus-abidesinin-yikilisiilk-turk-filmi
 Fuat Uzkınay at IMDb
 Fuat Uzkınay at Sinema Türk
 Fuat Uzkınay at turksinemasi.com

Turkish film directors
Turkish film producers
1888 births
1956 deaths